The 2021 Hankook Dubai 24 Hour was the 16th running of the Dubai 24 Hour. It was also the first round of the 2021 24H GT Series and TCE Series. The race was won by Julien Andlauer, Frédéric Fatien, Alain Ferté, Mathieu Jaminet and Axcil Jefferies in the #36 GPX Racing Porsche 911 GT3 R.

Schedule

Entry list
52 cars were entered into the event; 34 GT cars and 18 TCEs.

Results

Qualifying

GT
Fastest in class in bold.

TCE
Fastest in class in bold.

Race
Class winner in bold.

Footnotes

References

External links

Dubai 24 Hour
Dubai 24 Hour
Dubai 24 Hour
2021 in 24H Series